Awesome Possum... Kicks Dr. Machino's Butt is a video game created by Tengen for the Sega Mega Drive/Genesis that was released in late 1993. It also had many lines of digitized speech, unusual for its time, a feature with which the game was marketed. The box also states "it is an excellent educational game for all ages". The game included the voice talents of Walter Fields, Laurie Amat and Douglas Lawrence.

Plot
Mad scientist Dr. Machino has sent his robots to pollute the earth and endanger the wildlife. Aided by Killer Bee and Rad Rhino, Awesome Possum sets out to destroy the robots, put a stop to the mad scientist and save the world.

Gameplay
Awesome Possum includes environmental activist elements, with the character collecting empty bottles and cans, and answering questions about the environment to earn bonus points in his fight against the evil Dr. Machino. There are also various other animals located within levels which the character can ride to activate their ability, such as a bee which allows the character to fly or a rhino that catapults the character. There are a total of four worlds which together consist of 13 levels all together plus 12 bonus stages alongside the quiz which the character must collect as many recyclables as possible before the time expires.

Development 
In April 1992, Richard Seaborne was hired by Tengen to do a concept for an environmental game. Seaborne came up with the character "Awesome Possum" and by July 17, 1992, presented his proposal "Rad Rhino and Awesome Possum" to Tengen and they approved it. Development for the artwork was underway by Fall, but animations were unsatisfactory. Tengen hired Jules Marino on January 18, 1993, to polish the game character's sprites. The final title of the game was made official on May 13, 1993. The development team included a 12-page comic in the manual. When Time Warner Interactive took over Tengen in 1994, they also got the rights of the video game. Awesome Possum... Kicks Dr. Machino's Butt was produced and released during a trend of platformers starring animal mascots. The absence of Sega's third Sonic the Hedgehog title in the fall and holiday season of 1993 enabled other publishers to fill in space for mascot platformers, such as Tengen with Awesome Possum and Irem with Rocky Rodent.

Lawsuit
On June 20, 1997, Time Warner Interactive was charged with copyright infringement by Paul A. Roginski, who claimed that the game copied his comic book concept and character name for his manuscript. With Roginski lacking evidence to prove his claim, the case was closed and the defendants were acquitted.

Reception

GamePro praised the sound and speed, though they were somewhat critical on the graphics. Electronic Games, however, gave the game 93% and remarked "There are very few games that can produce this level of headbanging thrills." Brazilian magazine Ação Games gave the game an orange picture (the third level rating) for graphics, challenge, and fun; and a pink picture (the fourth and top level rating) for sound.

Hardcore Gamer, in a 2006 feature, condemned Awesome Possum: "There are bad games. There are terrible games. There are games so heinously appalling and horrendous that you want to gauge your eyes out with a spork after a few minutes of playtime. However, Tengen's Awesome Possum: Kicks Dr. Machino's Butt trumps them all with its crappy gameplay, muddy graphics, screeching music, warbled sound effects, and preachy sound effects." He was heavily irritated by the "annoying and narcissistic" personality of the title character, particularly his "screechy wisecracks" and his constant reminding of how "awesome" and "cool" he is. His other criticisms included the "horrific" title theme and the poor controls.

References

External links

1993 video games
Environmental mass media
Fictional opossums
Platform games
Sega Genesis games
Sega Genesis-only games
Tengen (company) games
Video games developed in the United States
Single-player video games